Stefanie Anke Hertel (born 25 July 1979 in Oelsnitz, Vogtland, Saxony, German Democratic Republic) is a German singer of popular music, popular folk music, schlager music, television presenter, and former yodeler.

Hertel has won numerous prizes as a performer; her career began at the age of four when she appeared with her father Eberhard Hertel. She was six when she made her television debut with a song about a teddy bear, Ich wünsch' mir einen kleinen Teddybär ("I wish me a little teddy bear"). In 1992, she won the Grand Prix der Volksmusik, which trumpeter Stefan Mross had won in 1989 with Heimwehmelodie, with the song Über jedes Bacherl geht a Brückerl, having finished fifth the previous year with So a Stückerl heile Welt. In 1995, she competed together with Stefan Mross in the Grand Prix der Volksmusik with the song Ein Lied für jeden Sonnenstrahl, finishing second.

Marriages

Hertel and Stefan Mross began dating in December 1993 and married on 6 September 2006. They separated in September 2011, and the divorce was finalised on 8 December 2012.
They have a daughter together, Johanna Mross (born 7 October 2001). On 19 April 2014, she married Austrian musician Leopold "Lanny" Lanner (formerly known professionally as Lanny Isis).

External links

1979 births
Living people
People from Oelsnitz, Vogtland
Yodelers
German folk singers
21st-century German  women  singers